Marc Glanville (born 12 June 1966) is an Australian former professional rugby league footballer who played the 1980s and 1990s.

Playing career
A Wagga Wagga Kangaroos junior who went on to be a Country New South Wales representative forward, he played for Australian clubs St. George and Newcastle, and for English club Leeds.

Glanville played for Leeds at loose forward in their 1998 Super League Grand Final loss to Wigan.

Glanville is currently part of KOFM's McDonald's Call Team - commentating Newcastle Knights Games for Newcastle Radio Station, KOFM He played for Country Origin in 1991, 1994 and 1997.

Personal life
Glanville has coached his sons Ryan and Matthew for many years in Rugby League for Souths Newcastle

Glanville now lives in Kotara with his wife Sharron Glanville and their three kids Jordan, Ryan and Matthew.

Jordan Glanville has achieved to be the youngest girl to join the Newcastle Knights Cheeleading Squad.  Ryan currently has played for the Newcastle Knights Under-20s team while Matthew has played rugby union.

References

External links
Rugby League Project stats
(archived by web.archive.org) Profile at leedsrugby

1966 births
Living people
Australian rugby league players
Leeds Rhinos players
Newcastle Knights players
Country New South Wales Origin rugby league team players
Rugby league locks
Rugby league players from Wagga Wagga
St. George Dragons players